The Diocese of Hyderabad is one of the 8 dioceses of the Church of Pakistan. The diocese was formed in 1980 and serves the entirety of the Sindh province of Pakistan, with the exception of Karachi. Most of its parishes exist in the rural areas of the province. The current bishop of the diocese is Rt Rev Kaleem John.

Parishes 
There are about 26 parishes that under the purview of the diocese. Most of them have a core urban congregation of Punjabi and Indian families who had converted to Christianity at the turn of the century. Rural agricultural Punjabi families make up a vast majority of the rural congregation scattered throughout the diocesan influence. A large number of new converts come from tribal Hindus living in rural Sindh.

Offices 
The diocese has had four bishops at the head of the office:
 Rt. Rev. Bashir Jiwan (1981–1997)
 Rt. Rev. S. K. Dass (1997–2002)
 Rt. Rev. Rafiq Masih (2003–23 June 2011)
 Rt. Rev. Kaleem John (2011–present)

References 

Dioceses in Asia
Hyderabad, Sindh
Church of Pakistan